Zia or ZIA (also spelled Ziya, Ḍiya , Dia or Diya) may refer to:

People
 Zia (name), including a list of people and fictional characters with the name
 A romanization of the Wu (Shanghainese) pronunciation of the Chinese surname Xie (謝)
 Queen Zia, the queen of costoboci.
 Zia people (New Mexico)
 Zia people (Papua New Guinea) 
 The Zia language of Papua New Guinea

Other uses
 Zia (brachiopod), a genus of brachiopods
 Zia (novel), by Scott O'Dell
 Applebay Zia, motor glider
 Zhukovsky International Airport, Russia
 Zamboanga International Airport, Philippines
 Zia, a small village on the Greek island of Kos
 Zia Record Exchange, a regional chain of record shops located across the American Southwest
 Zia International Airport, Bangladesh, now Shahjalal International Airport
 ZIA, a musical group founded by Elaine Walker

See also
 Sia (disambiguation)
 Tzia or Zia (Greek: Τζια), an alternative name for Kea (island), Cyclades, Greece 
 Ziya, the Turkish spelling of the Arabic name
 Ziaur a compound name beginning with "Zia"
 Ziauddin a common transliteration a common name

Zia From Bangladesh (Islamic University,  Kushtia Bangladesh) -Working In Saudi Arabia-In Pharmaceutical Company-Dammam